GRAC may refer to:

Great Rivers Athletic Conference
Guide to Receptors and Channels
the Game Rating and Administration Committee of South Korea